Clarence Elmer "Bud" Pinkston (February 1, 1900 – November 18, 1961) was an American diver. Born in Wichita, Kansas, he attended San Diego High where he won a Gymnastics title at age 15.  He is the first San Diegan to win an Olympic Gold Medal.  Pinkston attended college at Oregon State University and Stanford University. Pinkston won a gold medal in 10 metre platform diving and a silver medal in 3 metre springboard diving at the 1920 Summer Olympics; he won two bronze medals in the same two events at the 1924 Summer Olympics. Pinkston met Elizabeth "Betty" Becker at the 1924 Games; they later married and Pink became Betty's coach.

Betty and Clarence were avid supporters of the swimming and diving program at the Detroit Athletic Club. Pinkston (far better known as "Pink") served as aquatics director for the D.A.C. from 1927 until 1956; Pink continued as a coach for the club until his death in 1961. Several national champions and Olympic medalists trained under Pinkston's tutelage; including wife Betty, Richard Degener, Jeanne Stunyo and Barbara Sue Gilders - all were sponsored by the Detroit Athletic Club.

See also
 List of members of the International Swimming Hall of Fame
 Diving at the 1920 Summer Olympics
 Diving at the 1924 Summer Olympics

References

External links
 

1900 births
1961 deaths
Olympic gold medalists for the United States in diving
Olympic silver medalists for the United States in diving
Olympic bronze medalists for the United States in diving
Divers at the 1920 Summer Olympics
Divers at the 1924 Summer Olympics
Oregon State Beavers men's divers
Stanford Cardinal men's divers
American male divers
Medalists at the 1924 Summer Olympics
Medalists at the 1920 Summer Olympics
San Diego High School alumni